Rave Fever, also known as X-Mas Rave Fever) is a 1999 Hong Kong comedy film directed by Alan Mak starring Cantopop composer Mark Lui, who was also responsible for much of the film's music. It is a Christmas film that was released theatrically in Hong Kong on 23 December 1999 for the Christmas season.

Plot
Don (played by Cantopop composer Mark Lui) is a harried yuppie living in Hong Kong who has a one-night stand with a mysterious woman named Sonia. The next morning Sonia disappears but leaves her filofax in Don's possession. He attempts to retrace his steps from the previous night and encounters Nicole (played Jaymee Ong), a sexually liberated but potentially untrustworthy woman who may or may not have known Sonia. The filofax ends up in the hands of the journalist Ashley (played by YoYo Mung), who falls for the handsome yet troubled Steven (played by Terence Yin), who is revealed to be Sonia's former lover. Ashley begins to suspect that Sonia may have been the victim of foul play and her suspicions point her toward the peculiar club patron Gordon (played by Sam Lee).

Cast
 Mark Lui as Don Fung
 Terence Yin as Stephen
 Jaymee Ong as Nicole Ko
 Sam Lee as Gordon
 YoYo Mung as Ashley
 Bey Logan as Inspector Ryan
 Wah Sun Ng as Gordon's employer

Release
The film was released theatrically in Hong Kong on 23 December 1999. It was later presented in competition at the 2000 Stockholm Film Festival.
The film is rated R (Restricted).

Box office
The film earned HK$1,824,000 at the Hong Kong box office.

Reception and analysis
Author Gina Marchetti writes that with Rave Fever Alan Mak "experimented with elliptical narratives reminiscent of Hong Kong New Wave films".

In his book Planet Hong Kong: Popular Cinema and the Art of Entertainment, author David Bordwell calls the film "an experiment in Gen-X network narrative" involving "tracing crisscrossing love affairs".

The website lovehkfilm.com calls Rave Fever "Hong Kong's version of Go" and ultimately declares that "Rave Fever is nothing more than a candy-coated confection set against a sexy, neon-lit backdrop."

In his book Poetics of Cinema, author David Bordwell likewise notes a similarity between the American and Hong Kong films, writing, "Go (1999) and Rave Fever (1999) echo the network approach by reiterating events seen from different characters' angles and by expanding the roles assigned to bit players. Rave Fever also uses a circulating filofax to connect its party animals."

The website brns.com gave the film a rating of 7.5/10, writing, "This is not a sexy, highly charged exploration of the HK rave scene at all – but in fact a fairly subdued but very amusing comedy. It’s a comedy almost disguised within the veneer of a mystery – but as the mystery plays out almost like a shaggy dog story – the comedic aspects of the film become quite clever, very funny and have some wonderfully absurd moments."

Three reviewers on the website cityonfire.com gave the film positive ratings of 8.5/10, 7/10, and 8/10.

References

External links

Rave Fever at Hong Kong Cinemagic
Rave Fever at Hong Kong Movie Database

1999 comedy films
Hong Kong Christmas films
Hong Kong comedy films
Films shot in Hong Kong
Films set in Hong Kong
Films directed by Alan Mak